Steven Léo Shanahan (born September 16, 1970) is a politician in Montreal, Quebec, Canada. He has served on the Montreal City Council from 2013 to 2017 as a member of Vrai changement pour Montréal.

Early life and career
Shanahan was born in Sherbrooke. His campaign literature indicates that he is a marketing consultant with a bachelor's degree in administration from Bishop's University.

Career
Shanahan was elected to Montreal city council for the Peter-McGill division in the 2013 municipal election, winning a somewhat unexpected victory over star candidate Damien Silès from Équipe Denis Coderre pour Montréal. During the campaign, Shanahan promised to fight for a French-language school in the district.

Shanahan was the Conservative candidate for Ville-Marie—Le Sud-Ouest—Île-des-Sœurs in the 2015 Canadian federal election, during which he attended the 2015 Montreal Pride Parade while campaigning.

Shanahan ran again in the 2017 municipal election, but lost to Cathy Wong of Équipe Denis Coderre pour Montréal.

Electoral record

References

External links
City of Montreal biography (in French)
Vrai changement pour Montréal campaign site

Living people
Montreal city councillors
Politicians from Sherbrooke
Bishop's University alumni
1970 births
Conservative Party of Canada candidates for the Canadian House of Commons
Quebec candidates for Member of Parliament